Folke "Hinken" Holmberg (30 January 1927 – 22 February 2015) was a Swedish football player, best known for representing Hammarby IF.

Club career

Hammarby IF

Holmberg made his debut at age 18 for Hammarby IF in Division 2, Sweden's second tier.

In 1946–47, Hammarby finished last in Division 2, and got relegated to Division 4 due to a restructuring of the Swedish league system.

Holmberg decided to stay with the club and led the club to several promotions. He became known as a physically gifted player and prolific goalscorer in the lower divisions. When he left the club in 1951, Hammarby was back in Division 2, and Holmberg had scored a total of 69 goals in 86 league games.

Djurgårdens IF
In 1951, Holmberg moved to rivals Djurgårdens IF in Allsvenskan, the highest domestic league. He went on to make 24 appearances for the side during the next two seasons and scored 12 goals.

Return to Hammarby
Holmberg returned to Hammarby before the 1953–54 season and led the side to a promotion to Allsvenskan. After three seasons with Hammarby in the highest domestic league, Holmberg left the club again in 1957, having scored 20 goals in 57 appearances.

In the 1960s, he made a brief comeback as the player-manager of Stureby SK in the lower divisions.

International career
On 11 November 1951, Holmberg won his first and only cap for Sweden, in a 1–1 friendly away draw against Italy.

Personal life
His son Lars-Ove Holmberg also played for Hammarby from 1968 to 1973. Folke Holmberg died on 22 February 2015, aged 88.

References

1927 births
2015 deaths
Swedish footballers
Association football forwards
Allsvenskan players
Djurgårdens IF Fotboll players
Hammarby Fotboll players
Sweden international footballers
Footballers from Stockholm